The 1939 Coppa Italia Final was the final of the 1938–39 Coppa Italia. The match was played on 18 May 1939 between Ambrosiana-Inter and Novara. Ambrosiana-Inter won 2–1.

Match

References 
Coppa Italia 1938-39 statistics at rsssf.com
 https://www.calcio.com/calendario/ita-coppa-italia-1938/39-finale/2/
 https://www.worldfootball.net/schedule/ita-coppa-italia-1938/39-finale/2/

Coppa Italia Finals
Coppa Italia Final 1939
Novara F.C. matches